Om Jai Jagadish is a 2002 Indian Hindi drama film directed by Anupam Kher and was his directorial debut, and the only movie he has directed till date. The film stars Waheeda Rehman, Anil Kapoor, Fardeen Khan, Abhishek Bachchan, Mahima Chaudhry, Urmila Matondkar and Tara Sharma.

Synopsis 

Saraswati Batra (Waheeda Rehman) is the widowed mother of Om (Anil Kapoor), Jai (Fardeen Khan) and Jagadish (Abhishek Bachchan). Om is responsible and provides the income for the whole family. He works in a music company owned by his friend, Shekhar Malhotra (Parmeet Sethi). Jai is very ambitious (he wants to construct the world's fastest car) and is studying in the United States. His education is paid by Om for which he has taken loan from Shekhar Malhotra. Jagadish is a college student who is very good with computers. Jai soon returns after Om and his mother convinces him.

They all want different things and soon Om and Jai marry. Om marries the bubbly Ayesha (Mahima Chaudhry) MTV VJ and Jai marries Neetu (Urmila Matondkar), the daughter of a rich NRI. Jagadish is in love with Pooja (Tara Sharma) who is from Bangalore; they meet at a college festival. When Jai clashes with Om's values, they drift apart.

Soon Jai receives a promotion back in the United States and leaves with Neetu. Jagadish is caught computer hacking after trying to help a friend get the answers to a test and Om throws him out of the house as a result. Om, Ayesha and his mother have to leave the house after Om failed to pay the loan covering it. The three brothers are separated. Eventually, they all come together at the house auction to buy it back. Om is at the auction to see the winner and is surprised when Jagadish shows up to bid. He reveals that he used his hacking skills to create a program to block hackers instead. Jai comes at the end of the auction and bids more, which he got by selling his engine for the fastest car and realizes that his future is in India not in the United States. He doesn't have enough so the three brothers combine their money to win back the house, but it isn't enough. Finally, it is revealed that the CEO of the company that Jagadish made the hacking program bid for the house and won. Jagadish made a deal that the price of the house is the price of the program. The three brothers reunite and move back into the house.

Cast 
Waheeda Rehman as Saraswati Satya Prakash Batra
Anil Kapoor as Om Batra
Fardeen Khan as Jai Batra
Abhishek Bachchan as Jagadish "Jags" Batra
Mahima Chaudhry as Shanti / Ayesha Batra
Urmila Matondkar as Neetu Batra (née Saxena)                    
Tara Sharma as Pooja Batra
Parmeet Sethi as Shekhar Malhotra
Annu Kapoor as KK Mix
Rakesh Bedi as Ram Prasad “RP”
Raju Kher as Giri Saxena, Neetu's father
Lillete Dubey as Rita Saxena, Neetu's mother
Achint Kaur as Tanya Chopra (Shekhar Malhotra's fiancée)
Arun Bali as Anil Khanna, College Principal of Jagdish
Shishir Sharma as Narayan Pillai, CEO of Softel Technology Ltd.
K. C. Shankar as Employee of Softel Technology Ltd.
Rajesh Khera as Rehman
Tanishq (Child Artist) as Arnav Batra, Om’s son

Production 
Originally, Yash Raj Films wanted to rope in director Anupam Kher with his script and also wished to produce it, in a condition that the director managed to rope in Aamir Khan (Om), Shah Rukh Khan (Jai), Salman Khan (Jagadish), Rani Mukerji (Ayesha), Kajol (Neetu) & Preity Zinta (Pooja) to play the leading characters. However, surprisingly, all the actors declined the film stating date problems and the project was eventually produced by Vashu Bhagnani and released by Sa Re Ga Ma HMV. Some parts of the film is shot in Dunedin, New Zealand. The university campus is University of Otago's campus. In the film, the location referred to as Atlanta, United States is Dunedin, New Zealand.

Music 
The music was composed by Anu Malik, and the lyrics were written by Sameer. The soundtrack has the following songs:
"Om Jai Jagadish" - Sung by Abhijeet, Alka Yagnik Hariharan, Shaan
"Chori Chori" - Sung by Alka Yagnik, Sonu Nigam, Kunal Ganjawala
"Jeena Kya" - Sung by KK
"Happy Days" - Sung by Alka Yagnik, Udit Narayan, Sonu Nigam
"Shaadi" - Sung by Hema Sardesai, Shaan
"Love Story" - Sung by Abhijeet, Shaan, Kavita Krishnamurthy
"Pyar Ka Matlab" - Sung by Alka Yagnik, Kavita Krishnamurthy, Udit Narayan, Sonu Nigam

References

External links
 

2002 films
2000s Hindi-language films
Films scored by Anu Malik
2002 directorial debut films